Untold is a series of sports documentary films distributed on Netflix.

Summary
Each volume consists of multiple films released in weekly installments, with each film covering a unique and lesser-known sports story. Debuting in 2021, Volume 1 consists of five films that covered a range of different sports including basketball, tennis, hockey, and more. Volume 2 was released in 2022 with four more films, covering football, basketball, and more.

Volumes

Volume 1 (2021)
Untold: Malice at the Palace:  The brawl in the Palace of Auburn Hills between fans and professional basketball players.
Untold: Deal with the Devil:  Christy Martin's professional boxing career and life with her husband and trainer.
Untold: Caitlyn Jenner:  Caitlyn Jenner's life and Olympic career.
Untold: Crimes & Penalties:  The Danbury Trashers, a now defunct United Hockey League team.
Untold: Breaking Point:  Mardy Fish's life and career in professional tennis.

Volume 2 (2022)
Untold: The Girlfriend Who Didn't Exist:  Football player Manti Te'o's online relationship with a girl that didn't exist.
Untold: The Rise and Fall of AND1:  American sportswear brand AND1's rise and fall.
Untold: Operation Flagrant Foul:  NBA referee Tim Donaghy and his role in the 2007 NBA betting scandal.
Untold: The Race of the Century:  The 1983 America's Cup where the Australia II yacht crew dethroned the New York Yacht Club.

See also
30 for 30
Bad Sport

References

Netflix original documentary television series
Documentary television series about sports
2021 American television series debuts
English-language Netflix original programming